Waters is a surname, derived from "Wat", or "Wa'ter", an old pronunciation of Gaultier or Walter, and similarly derived from the surname Watson ("Wat's son"). The name is common from an early date in Wales and Yorkshire, as well as Shropshire, England. P. H. Reaney, co author of the book A Dictionary of English Surnames, said “water was the normal medieval pronunciation of Walter. Theobald Walter is also called Theobaldus filius Walteri, Theobaldus Walteri and Tebaut Water in the Feet of Fines for Lancashire 1212-1236.”

Statistics
In the United States of America, Waters is the 429th most common surname, with an estimated 64,662 people.  In New Zealand, Waters is the 350th most common surname, with an estimated 1,816 people.  However, Waters is the 252nd most popular surname in Australia with an estimated 13,768 people, while the United Kingdom ranks Waters as the 381st most popular surname, with 16,725 people.

People surnamed Waters

Military people
 Anna May Waters (1903–1987), Canadian military nurse
 Daniel Waters (Minutemen) (1731–1816), officer in the United States Navy.
 John K. Waters (1906–1989), former U.S. general, prisoner of war, and son-in-law of George S. Patton
 Terence Edward Waters (1929–1951), British soldier awarded the George Cross

Performers
 Crystal Waters (born 1964), American singer and songwriter
 David Waters (actor) (born 1975), Australian actor 
 Derek Waters (born 1979), American actor, comedian, screenwriter, producer and director
 Dina Waters (born 1965), American actress
 Doris Ethel Waters, better known as half of the comedy duo Gert and Daisy
 Ethel Waters (1896–1977), American singer and actress
 Florence Elsie Waters, better known as half of the comedy duo Gert and Daisy
 Horace John Waters, the birth name of actor Jack Warner
 Jeff Waters (born 1966), Canadian guitarist
 John Waters (actor) (born 1948), Australian actor
 McKinley Morganfield better known as Muddy Waters (1913–1983), American blues singer-songwriter and musician
 Rhys Waters (born 1984), Welsh Canadian comedian, producer and director
 Latanza Waters, house music singer
 Roger Waters (born 1943), English rock bassist, vocalist and lyricist, co-founder of Pink Floyd
 Russell Waters (1908–1982), Scottish film actor

Politicians
 Anne Marie Waters (born 1977), founder of the far-right For Britain party
 Charles A. Waters (1892–1972), American politician and judge
 Dan Waters, politician in Ontario, Canada
 Larissa Waters (born 1977), Australian politician
 Maxine Waters (born 1938), Democratic member of the U.S. House of Representatives
 Stanley Waters (1920–1991), Canadian Senator

Sportspeople
 Anthony Waters (born 1985), American football linebacker
 Beau Waters (born 1986), Australian rules footballer
 Ben Waters (1904–1962), New Zealand rower
 Brian Waters (born 1977), American football guard
 Carole Waters, retired Australian basketball player
 Dominic Waters (born 1986), American basketball player in the Israel Basketball Premier League
 Drew Waters (born 1998), American professional baseball player
 Fraser Waters (born 1976), South African footballer
 Guy Waters, Australian boxer of the 1980s, '90s and 2000s 
 Harry Waters (s. 1976), British piano and Hammond organ player
 Huw Waters (born 1986), Welsh cricketer
 Joseph Waters (rugby union)
 Katarina Waters (born 1980), English wrestler
 Tremont Waters (born 1998), American basketball player

Others
 Allan Waters (1921–2005), Canadian businessman
 Billie Waters (1896–1979), English artist
 Craig Waters (born 1956), public information officer of the Florida Supreme Court
 Daniel Waters (screenwriter) (born 1962), American screenwriter and film director, brother of Mark S. Waters
 David Roland Waters, the killer of the American activist Madalyn Murray O'Hair
 James Waters, Chairman of CHUM Limited
 John Waters (disambiguation)
John Waters (columnist), Irish columnist
John S. Waters (1893–1965), American filmmaker who directed films from 1916 until 1958
John Samuel Waters, Jr. (born 1946), American filmmaker
 Joseph Waters, composer
 Keith Waters (born 1962), pioneer in facial animation
 Lesley Waters (born 1961), English celebrity chef
 Lou Waters, CNN anchor
 Margaret Waters (1835–1870), English murderer
 Mark Waters (born 1964), American film director
 Mathew Waters (sound engineer), American sound engineer
 Miriam Van Waters (1887–1974), American feminist social worker
 Ralph M. Waters (1883–1979),  American anesthesiologist
 Richard Waters (1935–2013), American artist, inventor of Waterphone
 Sarah Waters (born 1966), Welsh novelist
 T.A. Waters, American writer fl. 1960s

People with the given name Waters
 Waters W. Braman (1840–1893), New York politician

See also
 Watters (surname)
 Walters (surname)

References

English-language surnames
Patronymic surnames